ROW Rybnik can refer to:

 KS ROW 1964 Rybnik, association football team
 ŻKS ROW Rybnik, motorcycle speedway team
 Basket ROW Rybnik, women's basketball team
 ROW Rybnik (multi-sports club), a multi-section sports club